Manitoba Provincial Road 258 is a former provincial road in the Canadian province of Manitoba.

Route description 

PR 258 connected PTH 16 (PTH 4 prior to 1977) at the eastern edge of Neepawa to PTH 3 and PTH 28 at Cartwright. Between Neepawa and Cartwright, PR 258 passed through Carberry and Glenboro, as well as Spruce Woods Provincial Park, which is located between the two communities.

For a more detailed description of the route, please refer to the Travel Route section for PTH 5.

History

Along with PTH 28, PR 258 was decommissioned in its entirety when PTH 5 was extended from Neepawa to its current southern terminus in 1980.

References

258